Inami can refer to:

Places
 Inami, Hyōgo, Japan
 Inami, Toyama, Japan
 Inami, Wakayama, Japan

People with the surname
, Japanese voice actress

Other uses
 Inami, one of the Celestial Warriors of Genbu in Fushigi Yūgi Genbu Kaiden
 Inami (TV series), a 2007 French animated cartoon series about ecological issues in Amazonia
 The National Institute of Migration (Mexico) (acronym for Instituto Nacional de Migración), the government entity in Mexico that controls and supervises migration

Japanese-language surnames